Martin Hederos is a founding member of Nymphet Noodlers and The Soundtrack of Our Lives. He is also a member of the duo Hederos & Hellberg together with Mattias Hellberg, as well as ex-Esbjörn Svensson Trio bassist Dan Berglund's Tonbruket collective. He has released two albums with Nino Ramsby; Visorna (2004) and Jazzen (2006).

References 

Swedish male musicians
Year of birth missing (living people)
Living people